The Defence Electronics and Components Agency (DECA) is an executive agency sponsored by the United Kingdom's Ministry of Defence. The agency was formed in April 2015 from the air division of the Defence Support Group, which was retained when the rest of the group was sold to Babcock International.

DECA provides maintenance, repair, overhaul, upgrade and obsolescence management for a diverse range of avionic and electronic equipment. It has recently been announced as the global repair hub for maintenance, repair, overhaul and upgrade services for the Lockheed Martin F-35 Lightning II aircraft avionic and aircraft components.

DECA's main base is MoD Sealand in Deeside, Flintshire. It also has a presence in MoD Stafford.

References

External links

 

Aerospace industry in the United Kingdom
Defence agencies of the United Kingdom
Electronics companies of the United Kingdom
Organizations established in 2015
2015 establishments in the United Kingdom
Organisations based in Flintshire
Government agencies established in 2015